The 1982 President's Cup Football Tournament was the 12th competition of Korea Cup. The competition was held from 5 to 18 June 1982. South Korea and Operário played out a 0–0 draw and shared the trophy.

Group stage

Group A

Group B

Knockout stage

Bracket

Semi-finals

Third place play-off

Final

See also
Korea Cup
South Korea national football team results

References

External links
President's Cup 1982 (South Korea) at RSSSF

1982